Mirjana Radojević (born 1990) is a politician in Serbia. She served in the Assembly of Vojvodina from 2016 to 2020 as a member of the Serbian Progressive Party.

Private career
Radojević is a graduated journalist. She lives in Nova Pazova in the municipality of Stara Pazova.

Politician
Radojević received the twenty-second position on the Progressive Party's electoral list in the 2016 Vojvodina provincial election and was elected when the list won a majority victory with sixty-three out of 120 mandates. She served with the government's majority for the next four years and did not seek re-election in 2020.

References

1990 births
Living people
People from Stara Pazova
Serbian women in politics
Members of the Assembly of Vojvodina
Serbian Progressive Party politicians